The Church of the Immaculate Conception, commonly known as Immaculate Conception St. Mary's Church, or simply St. Mary's Church, is a Catholic parish and church located in Yonkers, New York. It is the oldest Catholic parish in Yonkers.

History 
St. Mary's Church, as it was then named, was founded in 1848 as a parish consisting mostly of Irish immigrants to the United States. The first recorded baptisms in the parish occurred in October 1847. Land for the construction of a church building was donated by William W. Woodworth, Josiah Rich, and James Scrymser in the summer of that year, and Thomas Cornell, who was instrumental in the founding of the parish, had the street on which the land bordered to be renamed St. Mary's Street from South Street.

At its founding, the Jesuits played an active role in the administration of the parish. The first pastor was Fr. John Ryan, a Jesuit of St. John's College (the antecedent of Fordham University), who canonically established the parish and requested that it be named the Church of the Immaculate Conception, which it took as its official name by 1848, although it continued to be frequently referred to as St. Mary's. The original church was designed by Patrick Keely; it is now the parish hall.

The first mass was celebrated in the church on December 25, 1848, and the church was dedicated to the Immaculate Conception on November 16, 1851, making it the first church in the United States to be dedicated to the Immaculate Conception.

In 1852, a school was established, and in 1855, the St. Mary's Cemetery was opened. Beginning in 1857, this school was staffed by nuns of the Sisters of Charity, who were later replaced by the Lasallian Christian Brothers in 1861.

Architecture
Immaculate Conception was designed by Lawrence J. O'Connor in the Richardsonian Romanesque style. The main entrance is topped by a rounded arch supported by columns. It is built of rough-hewn brownstone and trimmed with red stone.

See also 

Catholic Marian church buildings
History of the Catholic Church in the United States
List of churches in the Roman Catholic Archdiocese of New York

Notes

References

Citations

Sources

External links 

Official website
Profile on Parishes Online
Archdiocese of New York website

Roman Catholic churches in New York (state)
Churches in Westchester County, New York
Roman Catholic Archdiocese of New York
Buildings and structures in Yonkers, New York
Richardsonian Romanesque architecture in New York (state)
Stone churches in New York (state)
U.S. Route 9